Saliou Lassissi (born 15 August 1978, in Abidjan) is an Ivorian former professional footballer who played as a defender, mainly in the role of centre-back, although on occasion he was also employed as right-back.

Honours
Parma
Supercoppa Italiana: 1999

Fiorentina
Coppa Italia: 2000–01

References

External links

1978 births
Living people
Association football defenders
Ivorian footballers
Ivory Coast international footballers
1998 African Cup of Nations players
Footballers from Abidjan
Stade Rennais F.C. players
Parma Calcio 1913 players
U.C. Sampdoria players
ACF Fiorentina players
A.S. Roma players
AS Nancy Lorraine players
AC Bellinzona players
Entente SSG players
Ligue 1 players
Serie A players
Swiss Challenge League players
Expatriate footballers in Italy
Expatriate footballers in France
Expatriate footballers in Switzerland
Ivorian expatriate footballers